Presidential elections were held in Finland on 16 January 1994, with a second round on 6 February. It was the first time the President had been solely and directly elected by a popular vote. Martti Ahtisaari defeated Elisabeth Rehn in the second round.

Voter turnout was 78.4% in the first round and 78.7% in the second. This was an open presidential election, because the two-term Finnish President, Mauno Koivisto, had refused to seek a third term. His popularity had also clearly declined since Finland entered into a deep economic recession in 1991.

Martti Ahtisaari, a former primary school teacher and a long-time United Nations diplomat, emerged as the frontrunner after winning the Social Democratic presidential primary in the spring of 1993.  Having lived abroad for many years during his diplomatic career, he was at first largely unknown to most Finnish voters.  On the other hand, he appeared not to be tainted with political scandals or allegations of opportunism, contrary to some of his opponents, especially the Centre Party presidential candidate, Paavo Väyrynen.  This was also the first Finnish presidential election to include a popular female candidate. Elisabeth Rehn, the small Swedish People's Party's presidential candidate, appealed to voters through her reputation as a diligent, caring and sincere woman.  She was serving as Defence Minister during the election.

Rehn's popularity rose dramatically in early January 1994, helping her defeat her two major bourgeois rivals, Väyrynen and the National Coalition candidate, Raimo Ilaskivi.  Väyrynen bitterly blamed the media for scheming to make his support appear to be falling just before the first round of voting.  Some Finns voted tactically for Rehn on the first round to eliminate Väyrynen from the second round.  Ahtisaari and Rehn agreed on many issues, such as Finland's intention to become a member of the European Union.  They disagreed partly on economic issues, with Ahtisaari favouring more economic stimulation and Rehn viewing increased economic stimulus sceptically. The three-week period between the first and second rounds of voting saw Ahtisaari's support rise significantly, and during the final week of campaigning opinion polls showed him leading Rehn.

Results

By province

First round

Second round

References

1994
1994 elections in Finland
January 1994 events in Europe
February 1994 events in Europe
1994